is a 2007 3DCG original video animation series produced by Dyna Method in cooperation with Itochu, Nippon Columbia and Shogakukan, based on the Sylvanian Families toy line by Epoch Co. It is the third adaptation of the Sylvanian Families characters to animation, preceded by the 1987 American animated series Sylvanian Families and the 1988 British stop motion animation Stories of the Sylvanian Families. It was produced by Kōji Kawaguchi and Yumiko Muriai, directed by Akira Takamura and the stories were written by Hiroko Odaka. The OVAs were released on June 20, 2007 on DVD with English-language subtitles. HiT Entertainment has licensed the series outside Japan.

Characters
The Periwinkles (Rabbits) - Alex, Kate, Oliver, Rebecca, Jamie
The Walnuts (Squirrels) - Cedric, Yardley, Ralph, Saffron
The Macavities (Cats) - Alonzo, Rumpus, Asparagus
The Huckleberries (Dogs) - Hubert Alan, Dennis
The Chocolates (Rabbits) - Frasier, Freya
The Slydales (Foxes) - Slick, Buster, Scarlett
The Cottontails (Rabbits) - Gromwell, Willow
The Petites (Bears) - Piers
The Keats (Cats) - Rosetti, Shelley

Voice actors
 Tomoko Kawakami - Milk Usagi-chan / Rebecca Periwinkle
 Akiko Hasegawa - Kurumi Risu-chan / Saffron Walnut
 Kana Ueda - Shima Neko-chan / Asparagus Macavity
 Kōki Miyata - Maron Inu-kun / Dennis Huckleberry
 Fushigi Yamada - Kuma-kun / Piers Petite
 Chinami Nishimura - Kitsune-kun / Buster Slydale, Milk Usagi-kun / Oliver Periwinkle
 Kaori Mizuhashi - Kitsune-chan / Scarlett Slydale
 Maya Okamoto - Chocolate Usagi-chan / Freya Chocolate, Kurumi Risu Okasan / Yardley Walnut
 Yukiko Mizuochi - Milk Usagi Okasan / Kate Periwinkle
 Aso Tomohisa - Cream Neko Otosan / Rossetti Keats
 Junichi Sugawara - Kitsune Otosan / Dr. Slick Slydale
 Toshitsugu Takashina - Milk Usagi Otosan / Alex Periwinkle
 Megumi Matsumoto - Kurumi Risu-kun / Ralph Walnut
 Makiko Ōmoto - Shima Neko-kun / Rumpus Macavity
 Hyo-sei -  Wata Usagi-kun / Gromwell Cottontail
 Ai Maeda - Cream Neko-chan / Shelley Keats
 Kiyoyuki Yanada - Maron Inu Sensei / Headmaster Hubert Alan Huckleberry
 Kōichi Yamadera - Kurumi Risu Otosan / Cedric Walnut

Episodes

Music
Koichiro Kameyama, of Project.R fame, was composer of the score for the OVA series.

The OVA's opening song is titled , performed by Hitomi Yoshida and the ending theme is titled  by Tomoko Kawakami, Akiko Hasegawa, Kōki Miyata, Fushigi Yamada, Kaori Mizuhashi and Maya Okamoto.

References

External links
 
 Official website of the Nippon Columbia version
 

2007 anime OVAs
Slice of life anime and manga
Works based on toys
Anime film and television articles using incorrect naming style

ja:シルバニアファミリー#.E3.82.A2.E3.83.8B.E3.83.A1.EF.BC.88.E6.97.A5.E6.9C.AC.E5.9B.BD.E5.86.85.E8.A3.BD.E4.BD.9C.E3.81.AECG.E3.82.A2.E3.83.8B.E3.83.A1.EF.BC.89